This is the all-time Maharlika Pilipinas Basketball League team standings. Standings are accurate as of the 2022 MPBL Finals.

Active teams

References

Maharlika Pilipinas Basketball League
Maharlika Pilipinas Basketball League lists